
Gmina Turek is a rural gmina (administrative district) in Turek County, Greater Poland Voivodeship, in west-central Poland. Its seat is the town of Turek, although the town is not part of the territory of the gmina.

Massacre during Second World War
During the German Invasion of Poland in 1939, German soldiers conducted a massacre in the area. 24 Poles were mass murdered on 7 September 1939. The victims were mostly farmers and refugees and elderly people(up to 80 years old).

Villages
Gmina Turek contains the villages and settlements of Albertów, Budy Słodkowskie, Chlebów, Cisew, Cisew Mały, Dzierżązna, Grabieniec, Kaczki Średnie, Kalinowa, Korytków, Kowale Księże, Obrębizna, Obrzębin, Pęcherzew, Słodków, Słodków-Kolonia, Szadów Księży, Szadów Pański, Szadowskie Góry, Turkowice, Warenka, Wietchinin, Wrząca and Żuki.

Neighbouring gminas
Gmina Turek is bordered by the town of Turek and by the gminas of Brudzew, Dobra, Kawęczyn, Malanów, Przykona, Tuliszków and Władysławów.

References

Polish official population figures 2006

Turek
Turek County
Massacres in Poland
Germany–Poland relations
Nazi war crimes in Poland